Hulen is an unincorporated community in northeast Cotton County, Oklahoma, United States. The community is just south of the Cotton-Comanche county line on Oklahoma State Highway 65 15 miles north of Temple. Lawton is approximately 12 miles to the northwest. The community is at an elevation of 1,083 feet.

References

Unincorporated communities in Cotton County, Oklahoma
Unincorporated communities in Oklahoma